General Herbert may refer to:

Arthur James Herbert (1820–1897), British Army general
George Herbert, 11th Earl of Pembroke (1759–1827), British Army general
Henry Herbert, 10th Earl of Pembroke (1734–1794), British Army general
Henry Herbert, 9th Earl of Pembroke (1693–1749), British Army lieutenant general
Ivor Herbert, 1st Baron Treowen (1851–1933), British Army major general
Otway Herbert (1901–1984), British Army lieutenant general
Percy Egerton Herbert (1822–1876), British Army lieutenant general
William Herbert (British Army officer) (c. 1696–1757), British Army major general
William Norman Herbert (1880–1949), British Army major general

See also
Attorney General Herbert (disambiguation)